The 2019–20 Dallas Mavericks season was the 40th season of the franchise in the National Basketball Association (NBA). This was the first season since  in which Dirk Nowitzki was not on the Mavericks roster as he retired in 2019. Nowitzki spent his entire 21-year career with the Mavericks, setting an NBA record.

The season was suspended by the league officials following the games of March 11 after it was reported that Rudy Gobert tested positive for COVID-19. The Mavericks and the Denver Nuggets played the final game before the suspension of the season, a 113–97 Mavericks win.

The Mavericks were one of the 22 teams invited to the NBA Bubble, and resumed play on July 31 with a 153–149 loss against the Houston Rockets. On August 2, after the Memphis Grizzlies lost against the San Antonio Spurs, the Mavericks clinched a spot in the 2020 NBA playoffs no worse than the seventh seed, marking their first trip to the playoffs since 2016. The Mavericks entered the playoffs as the seventh seed, facing the second seed Los Angeles Clippers in the first round, losing in six games.

The Mavericks averaged an offensive rating of 115.9 points scored per 100 possessions in the regular season, the highest in NBA history.

For this season, they added to new Statement jersey. In addition this color jersey is navy blue road alternate uniforms with blue side panels to their jerseys and shorts which remains until 2022.

Draft

The Mavericks' 2019 first-round draft pick was part of the package traded to the Atlanta Hawks for Luka Dončić in 2018.
The 37th pick was traded to the Detroit Pistons in exchange for the 45th pick along with two future second-round picks.

Roster

Standings

Division

Conference

Game log

Preseason

|-bgcolor=ffcccc
| 1
| October 8
| @ Oklahoma City
| 
| Kleber, Jackson (14)
| Ryan Broekhoff (10)
| Jalen Brunson (5)
| BOK Center12,055
| 0–1
|-bgcolor=ffcccc
| 2
| October 9
| @ Detroit
| 
| Luka Dončić (21)
| Luka Dončić (8)
| Luka Dončić (5)
| Little Caesars Arena9,695
| 0–2
|-bgcolor=ffcccc
| 3
| October 12
| Milwaukee
| 
| Luka Dončić (27)
| Boban Marjanović (8)
| three players (4)
| American Airlines Center17,082
| 0–3
|-bgcolor=ccffcc
| 4
| October 14
| Oklahoma City
| 
| Luka Dončić (27)
| Kristaps Porziņģis (13)
| J. J. Barea (8)
| American Airlines Center15,305
| 1–3
|-bgcolor=ccffcc
| 5
| October 17
| @ LA Clippers
| 
| Jackson, Porziņģis (18)
| Dončić, Porziņģis (13)
| Jalen Brunson (7)
| Rogers Arena17,204
| 2–3

Regular season
The schedule was announced on August 12, 2019.

The "seeding games" schedule for the restart was announced on June 26, 2020.

|-bgcolor=ccffcc
| 1
| October 23
| Washington
| 
| Luka Dončić (34)
| Luka Dončić (9)
| three players (3)
| American Airlines Center19,816
| 1–0
|-bgcolor=ccffcc
| 2
| October 25
| @ New Orleans
| 
| Luka Dončić (25)
| Dončić, Kleber (10)
| Luka Dončić (10)
| Smoothie King Center17,027
| 2–0
|-bgcolor=ffcccc
| 3
| October 27
| Portland
| 
| Kristaps Porziņģis (32)
| Luka Dončić (12)
| Luka Dončić (9)
| American Airlines Center19,707
| 2–1
|-bgcolor=ccffcc
| 4
| October 29
| @ Denver
| 
| Hardaway Jr., Kleber (14)
| Kristaps Porziņģis (14)
| Jalen Brunson (8)
| Pepsi Center16,605
| 3–1

|-bgcolor=ffcccc
| 5
| November 1
| L. A. Lakers
| 
| Luka Dončić (31)
| Luka Dončić (13)
| Luka Dončić (15)
| American Airlines Center20,358
| 3–2
|-bgcolor=ccffcc
| 6
| November 3
| @ Cleveland
| 
| Luka Dončić (29)
| Luka Dončić (14)
| Luka Dončić (15)
| Rocket Mortgage FieldHouse18,078
| 4–2
|-bgcolor=ccffcc
| 7
| November 6
| Orlando
| 
| Luka Dončić (27)
| Porziņģis, Powell (8)
| Luka Dončić (7)
| American Airlines Center19,487
| 5–2
|-bgcolor=ffcccc
| 8
| November 8
| New York
| 
| Luka Dončić (38)
| Luka Dončić (14)
| Luka Dončić (10)
| American Airlines Center20,257
| 5–3
|-bgcolor=ccffcc
| 9
| November 9
| @ Memphis
| 
| Luka Dončić (24)
| Luka Dončić (14)
| Luka Dončić (8)
| FedExForum15,753
| 6–3
|-bgcolor=ffcccc
| 10
| November 11
| @ Boston
| 
| Luka Dončić (34)
| Maxi Kleber (8)
| Luka Dončić (9)
| TD Garden18,624
| 6–4
|-bgcolor=ffcccc
| 11
| November 14
| @ New York
| 
| Luka Dončić (33)
| Kristaps Porziņģis (11)
| Luka Dončić (11)
| Madison Square Garden19,812
| 6–5
|-bgcolor=ccffcc
| 12
| November 16
| Toronto
| 
| Luka Dončić (26)
| Dončić, Porziņģis (15)
| Luka Dončić (7)
| American Airlines Center19,926
| 7–5
|-bgcolor=ccffcc
| 13
| November 18
| San Antonio
| 
| Luka Dončić (42)
| Luka Dončić (11)
| Luka Dončić (12)
| American Airlines Center19,637
| 8–5
|-bgcolor=ccffcc
| 14
| November 20
| Golden State
| 
| Luka Dončić (35)
| Dončić, Porziņģis (10)
| Luka Dončić (11)
| American Airlines Center19,569
| 9–5
|-bgcolor=ccffcc
| 15
| November 22
| Cleveland
| 
| Luka Dončić (30)
| Dončić, Porziņģis (7)
| Luka Dončić (14)
| American Airlines Center19,639
| 10–5
|-bgcolor=ccffcc
| 16
| November 24
| @ Houston
| 
| Luka Dončić (41)
| Kristaps Porziņģis (13)
| Luka Dončić (10)
| Toyota Center18,055
| 11–5
|-bgcolor=ffcccc
| 17
| November 26
| L. A. Clippers
| 
| Luka Dončić (22)
| Kristaps Porziņģis (10)
| Luka Dončić (6)
| American Airlines Center20,407
| 11–6
|-bgcolor=ccffcc
| 18
| November 29
| @ Phoenix
| 
| Luka Dončić (42)
| Kristaps Porziņģis (13)
| Luka Dončić (11)
| Talking Stick Resort Arena18,055
| 12–6

|-bgcolor=ccffcc
| 19
| December 1
| @ L. A. Lakers
| 
| Luka Dončić (27)
| three players (9)
| Luka Dončić (10)
| Staples Center18,997
| 13–6
|-bgcolor=ccffcc
| 20
| December 3
| @ New Orleans
| 
| Luka Dončić (33)
| Luka Dončić (18)
| J. J. Barea (6)
| Smoothie King Center14,664
| 14–6
|-bgcolor=ccffcc
| 21
| December 4
| Minnesota
| 
| Dwight Powell (24)
| Luka Dončić (7)
| Luka Dončić (6)
| American Airlines Center19,671
| 15–6
|-bgcolor=ccffcc
| 22
| December 7
| New Orleans
| 
| Luka Dončić (26)
| Boban Marjanović (16)
| Luka Dončić (9)
| American Airlines Center19,456
| 16–6
|-bgcolor=ffcccc
| 23
| December 8
| Sacramento
| 
| Tim Hardaway Jr. (29)
| Finney-Smith, Porziņģis (8)
| Luka Dončić (8)
| American Airlines Center19,566
| 16–7
|-bgcolor=ccffcc
| 24
| December 12
| @ Detroit
| 
| Luka Dončić (41)
| Luka Dončić (12)
| Luka Dončić (11)
| Mexico City Arena20,064
| 17–7
|-bgcolor=ffcccc
| 25
| December 14
| Miami
| 
| Tim Hardaway Jr. (28)
| Kristaps Porziņģis (14)
| Jalen Brunson (8)
| American Airlines Center20,333
| 17–8
|-bgcolor=ccffcc
| 26
| December 16
| @ Milwaukee
| 
| Curry, Porziņģis (26)
| Kristaps Porziņģis (12)
| Jalen Brunson (11)
| Fiserv Forum17,727
| 18–8
|-bgcolor=ffcccc
| 27
| December 18
| Boston
| 
| Kristaps Porziņģis (23)
| Kristaps Porziņģis (13)
| Jalen Brunson (11)
| American Airlines Center20,181
| 18–9
|-bgcolor=ccffcc
| 28
| December 20
| @ Philadelphia
| 
| Tim Hardaway Jr. (27)
| Kristaps Porziņģis (18)
| Jalen Brunson (7)
| Wells Fargo Center20,778
| 19–9
|-bgcolor=ffcccc
| 29
| December 22
| @ Toronto
| 
| Jalen Brunson (21)
| Kristaps Porziņģis (12)
| Jalen Brunson (9)
| Scotiabank Arena19,800
| 19–10
|-bgcolor=ccffcc
| 30
| December 26
| San Antonio
| 
| Luka Dončić (24)
| Maxi Kleber (12)
| Luka Dončić (8)
| American Airlines Center20,427
| 20–10
|-bgcolor=ccffcc
| 31
| December 28
| @ Golden State
| 
| Luka Dončić (31)
| Luka Dončić (12)
| Luka Dončić (15)
| Chase Center18,064
| 21–10
|-bgcolor=ffcccc
| 32
| December 29
| @ L. A. Lakers
| 
| Luka Dončić (19)
| Dwight Powell (11)
| Luka Dončić (7)
| Staples Center18,997
| 21–11
|-bgcolor=ffcccc
| 33
| December 31
| @ Oklahoma City
| 
| Luka Dončić (35)
| Maxi Kleber (14)
| Luka Dončić (7)
| Chesapeake Energy Arena18,203
| 21–12

|-bgcolor=ccffcc
| 34
| January 2
| Brooklyn
| 
| Luka Dončić (31)
| Luka Dončić (13)
| Luka Dončić (7)
| American Airlines Center20,289
| 22–12
|-bgcolor=ffcccc
| 35
| January 4
| Charlotte
| 
| Luka Dončić (39)
| Luka Dončić (12)
| Luka Dončić (10)
| American Airlines Center20,327
| 22–13
|-bgcolor=ccffcc
| 36
| January 6
| Chicago
| 
| Luka Dončić (38)
| Luka Dončić (11)
| Luka Dončić (10)
| American Airlines Center20,238
| 23–13
|-bgcolor=ffcccc
| 37
| January 8
| Denver
| 
| Luka Dončić (27)
| Luka Dončić (10)
| Luka Dončić (9)
| American Airlines Center20,314
| 23–14
|-bgcolor=ffcccc
| 38
| January 10
| L. A. Lakers
| 
| Luka Dončić (27)
| Dončić, Marjanovic (10)
| Luka Dončić (7)
| American Airlines Center20,542
| 23–15
|-bgcolor=ccffcc
| 39
| January 11
| Philadelphia
| 
| Dončić, Powell (19)
| Dwight Powell (12)
| Luka Dončić (12)
| American Airlines Center20,244
| 24–15
|-bgcolor=ccffcc
| 40
| January 14
| @ Golden State
| 
| Dwight Powell (21)
| Boban Marjanovic (11)
| Jalen Brunson (5)
| Chase Center18,064
| 25–15
|-bgcolor=ccffcc
| 41
| January 15
| @ Sacramento
| 
| Luka Dončić (25)
| Luka Dončić (15)
| Luka Dončić (17)
| Golden 1 Center17,029
| 26–15
|-bgcolor=ccffcc
| 42
| January 17
| Portland
| 
| Luka Dončić (35)
| Luka Dončić (8)
| Luka Dončić (7)
| American Airlines Center20,283
| 27–15
|-bgcolor=ffcccc
| 43
| January 21
| L. A. Clippers
| 
| Luka Dončić (36)
| Luka Dončić (10)
| Luka Dončić (9)
| American Airlines Center19,783
| 27–16
|-bgcolor=ccffcc
| 44
| January 23
| @ Portland
| 
| Luka Dončić (27)
| Dorian Finney-Smith (10)
| Luka Dončić (9)
| Moda Center18,574
| 28–16
|-bgcolor=ffcccc
| 45
| January 25
| @ Utah
| 
| Luka Dončić (25)
| Dorian Finney-Smith (10)
| Luka Dončić (7)
| Vivint Smart Home Arena18,306
| 28–17
|-bgcolor=ccffcc
| 46
| January 27
| @ Oklahoma City
| 
| Luka Dončić (29)
| Delon Wright (11)
| Luka Dončić (5)
| Chesapeake Energy Arena18,203
| 29–17
|-bgcolor=ffcccc
| 47
| January 28
| Phoenix
| 
| Luka Dončić (21)
| Luka Dončić (6)
| J. J. Barea (7)
| American Airlines Center20,216
| 29–18
|-bgcolor=ffcccc
| 48
| January 31
| @ Houston
| 
| Kristaps Porziņģis (35)
| Kristaps Porziņģis (12)
| J. J. Barea (9)
| Toyota Center18,055
| 29–19

|-bgcolor=ccffcc
| 49
| February 1
| Atlanta
| 
| Jalen Brunson (27)
| Willie Cauley-Stein (10)
| Jalen Brunson (8)
| American Airlines Center20,328
| 30–19
|-bgcolor=ccffcc
| 50
| February 3
| @ Indiana
| 
| Kristaps Porziņģis (38)
| Kristaps Porziņģis (12)
| Tim Hardaway Jr. (5)
| Bankers Life Fieldhouse15,086
| 31–19
|-bgcolor=ffcccc
| 51
| February 5
| Memphis
| 
| Kristaps Porziņģis (32)
| Kristaps Porziņģis (12)
| Jalen Brunson (6)
| American Airlines Center20,069
| 31–20
|-bgcolor=ffcccc
| 52
| February 7
| @ Washington
| 
| Seth Curry (20)
| Kristaps Porziņģis (9)
| Tim Hardaway Jr. (7)
| Capital One Arena20,476
| 31–21
|-bgcolor=ccffcc
| 53
| February 8
| @ Charlotte
| 
| Seth Curry (26)
| Willie Cauley-Stein (10)
| Delon Wright (7)
| Spectrum Center19,370
| 32–21
|-bgcolor=ffcccc
| 54
| February 10
| Utah
| 
| Tim Hardaway Jr. (33)
| Finney-Smith, Porziņģis (5)
| Barea, Brunson (6)
| American Airlines Center19,793
| 32–22
|-bgcolor=ccffcc
| 55
| February 12
| Sacramento
| 
| Luka Dončić (33)
| Kristaps Porziņģis (13)
| Luka Dončić (8)
| American Airlines Center19,842
| 33–22
|-bgcolor=ccffcc
| 56
| February 21
| @ Orlando
| 
| Luka Dončić (33)
| Dončić, Porziņģis (10)
| Luka Dončić (8)
| Amway Center18,846
| 34–22
|-bgcolor=ffcccc
| 57
| February 22
| @ Atlanta
| 
| Tim Hardaway Jr. (33)
| Jackson, Kleber (8)
| three players (5)
| State Farm Arena17,050
| 34–23
|-bgcolor=ccffcc
| 58
| February 24
| Minnesota
| 
| Tim Hardaway Jr. (23)
| Dončić, Porziņģis (9)
| Luka Dončić (9)
| American Airlines Center19,936
| 35–23
|-bgcolor=ccffcc
| 59
| February 26
| @ San Antonio
| 
| Kristaps Porziņģis (28)
| Kristaps Porziņģis (12)
| Luka Dončić (14)
| AT&T Center18,354
| 36–23
|-bgcolor=ffcccc
| 60
| February 28
| @ Miami
| 
| Seth Curry (37)
| Kristaps Porziņģis (13)
| Luka Dončić (11)
| American Airlines Arena19,704
| 36–24

|-bgcolor=ccffcc
| 61
| March 1
| @ Minnesota
| 
| Kristaps Porziņģis (38)
| Kristaps Porziņģis (13)
| J. J. Barea (7)
| Target Center18,058
| 37–24
|-bgcolor=ffcccc
| 62
| March 2
| @ Chicago
| 
| Tim Hardaway Jr. (26)
| Boban Marjanović (12)
| Luka Dončić (9)
| United Center18,407
| 37–25
|-bgcolor=ccffcc
| 63
| March 4
| New Orleans
| 
| Kristaps Porziņģis (34)
| Luka Dončić (17)
| Luka Dončić (10)
| American Airlines Center20,459
| 38–25
|-bgcolor=ccffcc
| 64
| March 6
| Memphis
| 
| Kristaps Porziņģis (26)
| Kristaps Porziņģis (11)
| Luka Dončić (6)
| American Airlines Center20,370
| 39–25
|-bgcolor=ffcccc
| 65
| March 8
| Indiana
| 
| Luka Dončić (36)
| Luka Dončić (10)
| Luka Dončić (8)
| American Airlines Center20,324
| 39–26
|-bgcolor=ffcccc
| 66
| March 10
| @ San Antonio
| 
| Luka Dončić (38)
| Kristaps Porziņģis (12)
| Luka Dončić (8)
| AT&T Center18,354
| 39–27
|-bgcolor=ccffcc
| 67
| March 11
| Denver
| 
| Boban Marjanović (31)
| Boban Marjanović (17)
| Luka Dončić (9)
| American Airlines Center20,302
| 40–27

|-bgcolor=ffcccc
| 68
| July 31
| Houston
| 
| Kristaps Porziņģis (39)
| Kristaps Porziņģis (16)
| Luka Dončić (10)
| The ArenaNo In-Person Attendance
| 40–28
|-bgcolor=ffcccc
| 69
| August 2
| @ Phoenix
| 
| Luka Dončić (40)
| Finney-Smith, Hardaway Jr. (10)
| Luka Dončić (11)
| Visa Athletic CenterNo In-Person Attendance
| 40–29
|-bgcolor=ccffcc
| 70
| August 4
| @ Sacramento
| 
| Luka Dončić (34)
| Luka Dončić (20)
| Luka Dončić (12)
| HP Field HouseNo In-Person Attendance
| 41–29
|-bgcolor=ffcccc
| 71
| August 6
| L. A. Clippers
| 
| Kristaps Porziņģis (30)
| Kristaps Porziņģis (9)
| Luka Dončić (6)
| HP Field HouseNo In-Person Attendance
| 41–30
|-bgcolor=ccffcc
| 72
| August 8
| Milwaukee
| 
| Luka Dončić (36)
| Luka Dončić (19)
| Luka Dončić (14)
| The ArenaNo In-Person Attendance
| 42–30
|-bgcolor=ccffcc
| 73
| August 10
| @ Utah
| 
| Tim Hardaway Jr. (27)
| Boban Marjanović (9)
| J. J. Barea (8)
| The ArenaNo In-Person Attendance
| 43–30
|-bgcolor=ffcccc
| 74
| August 11
| Portland
| 
| Kristaps Porziņģis (36)
| Luka Dončić (8)
| Burke, Dončić (9)
| The ArenaNo In-Person Attendance
| 43–31
|-bgcolor=ffcccc
| 75
| August 13
| @ Phoenix
| 
| Dončić, Marjanović (18)
| Marjanović (20)
| Barea, Wright (4)
| The ArenaNo In-Person Attendance
| 43–32

|- style="background:#;"
| 68
| March 14
| Phoenix
| 
|
|
|
| American Airlines Center
|
|- style="background:#;"
| 69
| March 16
| @ LA Clippers
| 
|
|
|
| Staples Center
|
|- style="background:#;"
| 70
| March 17
| Sacramento
| 
|
|
|
| Golden 1 Center
|
|- style="background:#;"
| 71
| March 19
| @ Portland
| 
|
|
|
| Moda Center
|
|- style="background:#;"
| 72
| March 21
| @ Phoenix
| 
|
|
|
| Talking Stick Resort Arena
|
|- style="background:#;"
| 73
| March 23
| Houston
| 
|
|
|
| American Airlines Center
|
|- style="background:#;"
| 74
| March 26
| Utah
| 
|
|
|
| American Airlines Center
|
|- style="background:#;"
| 75
| March 29
| Milwaukee
| 
|
|
|
| American Airlines Center
|
|- style="background:#;"
| 76
| April 1
| @ Minnesota
| 
|
|
|
| Target Center
|
|- style="background:#;"
| 77
| April 3
| @ Memphis
| 
|
|
|
| FedExForum
|
|- style="background:#;"
| 78
| April 5
| @ Brooklyn
| 
|
|
|
| Barclays Center
|
|- style="background:#;"
| 79
| April 7
| Houston
| 
|
|
|
| American Airlines Center
|
|- style="background:#;"
| 80
| April 11
| Detroit
| 
|
|
|
| American Airlines Center
|
|- style="background:#;"
| 81
| April 13
| @ Denver
| 
|
|
|
| Pepsi Center
|
|- style="background:#;"
| 82
| April 15
| Oklahoma City
| 
|
|
|
| American Airlines Center
|

Postseason

|-bgcolor=ffcccc
| 1
| August 17
| @ L. A. Clippers
| 
| Luka Dončić (42)
| Boban Marjanović (8)
| Luka Dončić (9)
| The ArenaNo In-Person Attendance
| 0–1
|-bgcolor=ccffcc
| 2
| August 19
| @ L. A. Clippers
| 
| Luka Dončić (28)
| Maxi Kleber (10)
| Luka Dončić (7)
| The ArenaNo In-Person Attendance
| 1–1
|-bgcolor=ffcccc
| 3
| August 21
| L. A. Clippers
| 
| Kristaps Porzingis (34)
| Kristaps Porzingis (13)
| Luka Dončić (10)
| The ArenaNo In-Person Attendance
| 1–2
|-bgcolor=ccffcc
| 4
| August 23
| L. A. Clippers
| 
| Luka Dončić (43)
| Luka Dončić (17)
| Luka Dončić (13)
| The ArenaNo In-Person Attendance
| 2–2
|-bgcolor=ffcccc
| 5
| August 25
| @ L. A. Clippers
| 
| Luka Dončić (22)
| Luka Dončić (8)
| Dončić, Finney-Smith (4)
| The ArenaNo In-Person Attendance
| 2–3
|-bgcolor=ffcccc
| 6
| August 30
| L. A. Clippers
| 
| Luka Dončić (38)
| Burke, Dončić (9)
| Luka Dončić (9)
| The ArenaNo In-Person Attendance
| 2–4
|-

Player statistics

Regular season
As of August 13, 2020.

|-
| 
| 29 || 6 || 15.5 || .411 || .376 || .909 || 1.8 || 3.9 || .2 || .1 || 7.7
|-
| ‡
| 17 || 1 || 10.6 || .373 || .392 || .875 || 2.5 || .6 || .3 || .2 || 4.2
|-
| 
| 57 || 16 || 17.9 || .466 || .358 || .813 || 2.4 || 3.3 || .4 || .1 || 8.2
|-
| 
| 8 || 1 || 23.9 || .427 || .432 || .909 || 1.9 || 3.8 || 1.1 || .1 || 12.0
|-
| ≠
| 13 || 2 || 12.1 || style=background:#0B60AD;color:white;|.689 || .000 || .556 || 4.6 || .8 || .3 || .8 || 5.2
|-
| 
| 11 || 0 || 4.2 || .286 || .000 || .600 || .6 || .1 || .1 || .3 || 1.0
|-
| 
| 64 || 25 || 24.6 || .495 || style=background:#0B60AD;color:white;|.452 || .825 || 2.3 || 1.9 || .6 || .1 || 12.4
|-
| 
| 61 || 61 || style=background:#0B60AD;color:white;|33.6 || .463 || .316 || .758 || 9.4 || style=background:#0B60AD;color:white;|8.8 || 1.0 || .2 || style=background:#0B60AD;color:white;|28.8
|-
| 
| 71 || style=background:#0B60AD;color:white;|68 || 29.9 || .466 || .376 || .722 || 5.7 || 1.6 || .6 || .5 || 9.5
|-
| 
| 71 || 58 || 29.5 || .434 || .398 || .819 || 3.3 || 1.9 || .6 || .1 || 15.8
|-
| 
| 65 || 3 || 16.1 || .396 || .294 || .840 || 2.4 || .8 || .2 || .2 || 5.5
|-
| ≠
| 13 || 0 || 9.3 || .308 || .000 || .800 || 2.5 || .3 || .2 || .2 || .9
|-
| 
| style=background:#0B60AD;color:white;|74 || 21 || 25.5 || .461 || .373 || .849 || 5.2 || 1.2 || .3 || 1.1 || 9.1
|-
| 
| 24 || 9 || 14.4 || .488 || .447 || .857 || 1.3 || .5 || .8 || .3 || 4.5
|-
| 
| 44 || 5 || 9.6 || .573 || .235 || .754 || 4.5 || .5 || .2 || .2 || 6.6
|-
| 
| 57 || 57 || 31.8 || .427 || .352 || .799 || style=background:#0B60AD;color:white;|9.5 || 1.8 || .7 || style=background:#0B60AD;color:white;|2.0 || 20.4
|-
| 
| 40 || 37 || 26.5 || .638 || .256 || .667 || 5.7 || 1.5 || .9 || .6 || 9.4
|-
| 
| 4 || 0 || 7.0 || .333 || .000 || style=background:#0B60AD;color:white;|1.000 || .8 || .8 || .0 || .0 || 2.0
|-
| 
| 73 || 5 || 21.5 || .462 || .370 || .770 || 3.8 || 3.3 || style=background:#0B60AD;color:white;|1.2 || .3 || 6.9
|}
‡Waived during the season
≠Acquired during the season

Playoffs
As of August 30, 2020.

|-
| 
| 1 || 0 || 5.0 || .000 || .000 || 1.000 || .0 || .0 || .0 || .0 || 3.0
|-
| 
| 6 || 3 || 26.0 || .508 || .471 || .600 || 3.2 || 2.0 || 1.3 || .3 || 12.3
|-
| 
| 2 || 0 || 4.5 || .400 || .000 || .000 || .5 || .0 || .5 || .0 || 2.0
|-
| 
| 6 || 0 || 28.8 || .585 || .476 || 1.000 || 1.8 || 1.3 || 1.0 || .0 || 12.8
|-
| 
| 6 || 6 || style=background:#0B60AD;color:white;|35.8 || .500 || .364 || .656 || style=background:#0B60AD;color:white;|9.8 || style=background:#0B60AD;color:white;|8.7 || 1.2 || .5 || style=background:#0B60AD;color:white;|31.0
|-
| 
| 6 || 6 || 31.8 || .442 || .367 || .800 || 5.7 || 3.2 || 1.2 || .5 || 10.2
|-
| 
| 6 || 6 || 34.0 || .421 || .352 || .727 || 3.5 || 1.8 || .3 || .0 || 17.8
|-
| 
| 3 || 0 || 5.3 || .167 || .000 || .500 || 1.0 || .0 || .0 || .0 || 1.3
|-
| 
| 6 || 0 || 9.2 || .286 || .222 || .667 || 1.0 || .5 || .2 || .2 || 2.3
|-
| 
| 6 || 6 || 33.8 || .333 || .192 || .750 || 6.5 || 1.5 || .3 || 1.2 || 6.7
|-
| 
| 6 || 0 || 13.7 || .567 || .000 || .778 || 5.8 || .8 || .0 || .3 || 6.8
|-
| 
| 3 || 3 || 31.3 || .525 || style=background:#0B60AD;color:white;|.529 || .870 || 8.7 || .7 || .0 || style=background:#0B60AD;color:white;|1.0 || 23.7
|-
| 
| 2 || 0 || 4.5 || .333 || .000 || 1.000 || 1.0 || .5 || .0 || .5 || 2.0
|-
| 
| 4 || 0 || 13.3 || style=background:#0B60AD;color:white;|.600 || .500 || .600 || .8 || 1.8 || 1.3 || .0 || 4.0
|}

Awards

Transactions

Trades

Free agents

Re-signed

Additions

Subtractions

References

Dallas Mavericks seasons
Dallas Mavericks
Dallas Mavericks
Dallas Mavericks
Dallas Mavericks
Dallas Mavericks
2010s in Dallas
2020s in Dallas